Thomas Archer ( – February 17, 1870) was an American politician from Maryland. He served as a member of the Maryland House of Delegates, representing Harford County in 1864.

Career
Archer served as a member of the Maryland House of Delegates, representing Harford County in 1864. He was elected on a Unconditional Union Party ticket. Archer ran as a Republican in 1865 for the Maryland Senate, but lost.

Personal life
Archer had children, including R. Harris and J. Glasgow. R. Harris Archer also served as a state delegate. J. Glasgow worked as a pastor in a Presbyterian Church in western Pennsylvania.

Archer died on February 17, 1870, at the age of 62, at his home near Churchville, Maryland.

References

Year of birth uncertain
1800s births
1870 deaths
People from Churchville, Maryland
Maryland Republicans
Members of the Maryland House of Delegates